Horror Express (Spanish: Pánico en el Transiberiano, lit. "Panic on the Trans-Siberian") is a 1972 science fiction horror film directed by Eugenio Martín. It stars Christopher Lee and Peter Cushing, with Alberto de Mendoza, Silvia Tortosa, Julio Peña, George Rigaud, Ángel del Pozo, and Telly Savalas in supporting roles.

Set in 1906, the film's storyline follows the various passengers aboard a European-bound Trans-Siberian Railway train. They are soon stalked, one-by-one, by an alien intelligence inhabiting the frozen body of an ancient primitive humanoid brought onboard by an anthropologist.

Plot
In 1906, Professor Sir Alexander Saxton, a British anthropologist, is returning to Europe by the Trans-Siberian Express from Shanghai to Moscow. With him is a crate containing the frozen remains of a primitive humanoid that he discovered in a cave in Manchuria. He hopes it is a missing link in human evolution. Doctor Wells, Saxton's friendly rival and Geological Society colleague, is also waiting to board. Also waiting is Polish Count Marion Petrovski and his wife, Countess Irina. With the couple is their spiritual advisor, an Eastern Orthodox monk named Father Pujardov, who proclaims to Saxton that the contents of the crate are evil. Additional passengers include Inspector Mirov and a squad of soldiers.

Saxton‘s eagerness to keep his scientific findings secret arouses the suspicion of Wells, who bribes a porter to investigate the crate. The porter is killed by the defrosted humanoid within, who escaped the crate after picking the lock and kills several more passengers. Wells performs an autopsy and deduces that the creature absorbs the skills and memories of its victims. When the humanoid is gunned down by Mirov, the threat seems to have been eliminated. Saxton and Wells discover that the real threat is a formless extraterrestrial that inhabited the body of the humanoid. Unknown to them, the creature has transferred itself into Mirov.

The extraterrestrial has been stranded on Earth for millions of years. It kills passengers with specific knowledge that could help it build a new spaceship. Eventually, Cossack Captain Kazan stabs and shoots Mirov. With Mirov dying, Pujardov, believing the creature to be Satan and having pledged allegiance to it prior, allows it to possess him. The passengers flee to the brake van while the alien murders Kazan, his men, and the Count. Saxton, having discovered the creature cannot use its powers when it is exposed to light, blinds it. The alien bargains with Saxton, tempting him with its advanced knowledge of technology and cures for diseases. When Saxton refuses, it resurrects all its victims as zombies, and has them attack Saxton.

Saxton and the countess fight their way through the train until they reach the van, where the other survivors have taken refuge. Saxton and Wells uncouple the van from the rest of the train containing the alien. Kazan's superiors send a telegram to a dispatch station ahead, instructing them to destroy the train by sending it down a siding overlooking a gorge. The survivors watch as the train crashes down the gorge and goes up in flames.

Cast
 Christopher Lee as Professor Sir Alexander Saxton
 Peter Cushing as Dr. Wells
 Alberto de Mendoza as Father Pujardov (dubbed by Robert Rietti)
 Silvia Tortosa as Countess Irina Petrovski (dubbed by Olive Gregg)
 Julio Peña as Inspector Mirov (dubbed by Roger Delgado)
 Telly Savalas as Captain Kazan
 George Rigaud as Count Marion Petrovski 
 Helga Liné as Natasha (dubbed by Olive Gregg)
 Alice Reinheart as Miss Jones (dubbed by Olive Gregg)
 Ángel del Pozo as Yevtushenko
 José Jaspe as Conductor Konev 
 Víctor Israel as Baggage Man
 Faith Clift as Miss Bennett
 Juan Olaguivel as the Creature 
 Barta Barri as First Telegraphist
 Hiroshi Kitatawa as Grashinski, the Thief
 Vicente Roca as Stationmaster
 José Canalejas as Russian Guard
 José Marco as Vorkin
 Allen Russell as Captain O'Hagan

Production

Development
The film was co-produced by American screenwriter/producer Bernard Gordon, who had collaborated with Martin on the 1972 film Pancho Villa (which featured Savalas in the title role). Martin made Horror Express as part of a three-picture contract he had with Philip Yordan, and Savalas was under contract with Yordan as well. The film was a co-production between Spain's Granada Films and the British company Benmar Productions, who made Psychomania (1971).

According to Martin, the film was made because a producer obtained a train set from Nicholas and Alexandra (1971). "He came up with the idea of writing a script just so he would be able to use this prop," said Martin. "Now at that time, Phil was in the habit of buying up loads of short stories to adapt into screenplays, and the story for Horror Express was originally based on a tale written by a little-known American scriptwriter and playwright."

Rumors that the train sets were acquired from the production of Doctor Zhivago (or Nicholas and Alexandra) were refuted by Gordon, who said in a 2000 interview that the model had been constructed for the feature film Pancho Villa. Filmmakers used the mock-up from Pancho Villa as the interior for all train cars during production. Since no further room was available on stage, all scenes within each train car were shot consecutively. The set was then modified for the next car's scenes.

Shooting
Horror Express was filmed in Madrid between 1971 and 1972. It was produced on a low budget of $300,000, with the luxury of having three familiar genre actors in the lead roles; the filming began in December 1971.

Securing Lee and Cushing was a coup for Gordon, since it lent an atmosphere reminiscent of the horror Hammer Films, many of which starred both actors. When Cushing arrived in Madrid to begin work on the picture, he was still distraught over the recent death of his wife. He announced to Gordon that he could not do the film. With Gordon now desperate over the idea of losing one of his important stars, Lee stepped in and put Cushing at ease, simply by talking to his old friend about some of their previous work together; Cushing changed his mind and stayed on.

The train's departure scene was filmed in Madrid's Delicias railway station. The locomotive pulling the train in that scene is a RENFE 141F; later in the film, miniatures are utilized for the exterior shots of the train going by camera and for the film's climax.

Like all Italian and Spanish films of the period, Horror Express was filmed mostly without sound, with the effects and voices dubbed for the film in post-production; Lee, Cushing, and Savalas all provided their own voices for the English-speaking version.

Release and reception
Horror Express generally received positive reviews. At the review aggregator website Rotten Tomatoes, the film has a 80% approval rating, with an average rating of 6.85 out of 10, based on 15 reviews.

The film was originally titled Pánico en el Transiberiano. It was first released for showing as an official selection at the Sitges Film Festival on 30 September 1972. The film's director, Eugenio Martín, won the Critic's Best Script Award. According to Martín, Spain, his native country, was where the film fared the worst, both critically and for its low box office revenue. It was received positively in other film markets where the audience was more familiar with low-budget horror films; these included Great Britain, the United States, and Australia. "I was a bit surprised myself at the film's popularity overseas, but it didn’t really do a great deal for my subsequent career", said Martin.

Montgomery Advertiser film critic Jery Tillotson gave the film a positive review, writing, "Good performances, brisk direction, and fast action moves this thriller a notch above the average shocker".

Home media
A special edition Blu-ray/DVD film release was issued in 2011 by Severin Films. Arrow Films re-released a new Blu-ray edition on 12 February 2019.

Legacy
The film was used as a "virtual reality" experience for the 2021 television show Creepshow (season 2, episode 5: "Night of the Living Late Show"). In that episode, the film is the favorite of inventor Simon Sherman (portrayed by Justin Long), who had it placed as one of the interactive features in his virtual reality invention called the Immersopod. While archive footage of Christopher Lee and Peter Cushing are used in the episode, Hannah Fierman portrays her rendition of Countess Irina Petrovsky, with whom Simon begins a relationship with since he's had a crush on her since a young boy.

References

Sources

Reviews
 "Horror Express" review by Brett Gallman at Oh, the Horror!
 "Horror Express (Blu-ray)" review by Adam Tyner at DVDTalk.com
 "Horror Express" review at Mondo-digital.com

External links

 
 
 

1972 films
1972 horror films
1970s monster movies
Articles containing video clips
Spanish zombie films
Spanish science fiction horror films
English-language Spanish films
Films about ancient astronauts
Films set in 1906
Films set in China
Films set in Russia
Films set on the Trans-Siberian Railway
Films set on trains
Films shot in Madrid
Films with screenplays by Arnaud d'Usseau
Alien visitations in films
1970s science fiction horror films
Films set in Shanghai
Films set in the Qing dynasty
Films set in the Russian Empire
Films directed by Eugenio Martín
British zombie films
1970s exploitation films
Films set in the 1900s
1970s English-language films
1970s British films
1970s Spanish films